General Ryamizard Ryacudu  (born 21 April 1950) is an Indonesian politician who served as the Minister of Defense of Indonesia from 2014 until 2019. He previously served as Chief of Staff of the Indonesian Army from 2002 to 2005, and was Commander of Army Strategic Command from 2000 to 2002.

References

1950 births
Living people
Indonesian Muslims
People from Palembang
Lampung people
Indonesian generals
Indonesian National Military Academy alumni
Defense ministers of Indonesia
Working Cabinet (Joko Widodo)